Volvatella is a genus of sea snails, bubble snails, a marine gastropod sacoglossan mollusk in the family Volvatellidae.

Species
Species within the genus Volvatella include:
 Volvatella angeliniana Ichikawa, 1993
 Volvatella australis Jensen, 1997
 Volvatella ayakii Hamatani, 1972
 Volvatella bermudae K.B. Clark, 1982
 Volvatella candida Pease, 1868
 Volvatella cincta G. Nevill & H. Nevill, 1869
 Volvatella elioti (Evans, 1950)
 Volvatella evansi (Kay, 1961)
 Volvatella ficula Burn, 1966
 Volvatella fragilis Pease, 1860
 Volvatella kawamurai Habe, 1946
 Volvatella laguncula G.B. Sowerby III, 1894
 Volvatella omega (Melvill, 1918)
 Volvatella pyriformis Pease, 1868
 Volvatella ventricosa Jensen & Wells, 1990
 Volvatella vigourouxi (Montrouzier, 1861)
 Volvatella viridis Hamatani, 1976

References

 Jensen K.R. (2007) Biogeography of the Sacoglossa (Mollusca, Opisthobranchia). Bonner Zoologische Beiträge 55:255–281

Volvatellidae